Taojiadu Subdistrict is a subdistrict in Xi District, Panzhihua, Sichuan, China. , it has four residential neighborhoods under its administration:
Kuangjian Community
Baoding Community
Huashan Community
Taiping Community

See also 
 List of township-level divisions of Sichuan

References 

Township-level divisions of Sichuan
Panzhihua